The Goldene Kamera ("Golden Camera") is an annual German film and television award, awarded by the Funke Mediengruppe. The award show is usually held in early February in Hamburg, but has also taken place in Berlin in the past.

The gold-plated silver award model was created by Berlin artist Wolfram Beck.

History 
The award was first presented in 1966 as a strictly German television award. Since 1987, it has also been awarded to international stars. In 1995, the categories expanded to pop groups and to more public interests. In 2019, a 'Climate Action Award' was given to Greta Thunberg.

In September 2019, Funke Mediengruppe announced the end of the traditional award for 2020. Due to a change in media consumption preferences of their audience in the course of digitization, the manager of Funke's magazine division said that the group would instead focus on digital content like the "YouTube Goldene Kamera Digital Award".

The final 'Goldene Kamera' was planned to be awarded on 21 March 2020 with Thomas Gottschalk as presenter. Due to the COVID-19 pandemic, the event in March 2020 was cancelled; it was rescheduled initially for 12 November 2020, and later again to an unspecified date.

Traditional Awards categories

 Best National Actor/Actress
 Best International Actor/Actress
 Best National TV Movie
 Best National TV Show
 Best Newcomer Actor/Actress

References

External links

 

German television awards
Awards established in 1966
1966 establishments in West Germany